Rob Speyer (born 1969) is an American real estate developer. He is the CEO of New York City real estate company Tishman Speyer.

Early life and education
Speyer was born to a Jewish family, the son of Lynn (née Tishman) and Jerry Speyer. His great-grandfather, Julius Tishman, founded Tishman Realty and Construction; and his father Jerry Speyer and his maternal grandfather, Robert Tishman, founded the real estate development firm Tishman Speyer. His parents divorced in 1987. In 1992, he graduated magna cum laude from Columbia College, where he was elected to Phi Beta Kappa.  He is an emeritus member of the Board of Visitors at Columbia College. He worked as a reporter for the New York Daily News before joining Tishman Speyer.

Career
In 2015, Speyer became Tishman Speyer's president and chief executive officer.

Speyer was a member of the Real Estate Board of New York's (REBNY) executive committee since 2004, and became the chairman of the committee in 2013. He was named chairman of the advisory board of the Mayor's Fund to Advance New York City in 2006, reappointed in 2014 by Mayor Bill de Blasio and then reappointed by Mayor Adams.

Speyer sits on the board of trustees of New York-Presbyterian Hospital; the board of visitors of Columbia College (emeritus); the board of directors of the Real Estate Roundtable; the board of trustees of the Citizens Budget Commission; and on the board of directors of Exor.

Personal life
In 2008, Speyer married Anne-Cecilie Engell.

References

1969 births
American chief executives
American real estate businesspeople
American people of German-Jewish descent
Columbia College (New York) alumni
Living people
New York Daily News people
Tishman family